The Komatsu 830E is an ultra class haul truck used in open pit mining designed and built in Peoria, Illinois by Komatsu America Corporation, whose parent company is the Japanese held company Komatsu Ltd.

While large, the 830E's capacity is just under two-thirds the capacity of its two largest competitors.
The Liebherr T 282C and Caterpillar 797B. It differs from conventional dump trucks as it uses an electric drive system instead of a transmission/differential drive. The diesel engine is connected to a GE traction alternator then high voltage cables transfer electricity to the two wheel motors at the rear of the truck.

Previously the 830E was made by Dresser Industries, before it was taken over by Komatsu.

References 

 http://www.komatsu.com.au/Equipment/Pages/Dump%20Trucks%20-%20Rigid/830E-1AC.aspx

Komatsu vehicles
Hybrid trucks
Haul trucks